Ruaha is an administrative ward in the Iringa Urban district of the Iringa Region of Tanzania. In 2016 the Tanzania National Bureau of Statistics report there were 13,401 people in the ward, from 16,984 in 2012.

Neighborhoods 
The ward has 13 neighborhoods.

 Buguruni
 Chuo
 Ipogolo 'A'
 Ipogolo 'B'
 Ipogolo 'C'
 Ipogolo 'D'
 Ipogolo 'E'
 Kinegamgosi 'A'
 Kinegamgosi 'B'
 Kinegamgosi 'C'
 Mwagongo
 Ngeleli
 Tagamenda

References 

Wards of Iringa Region